The Remixes, Volume 1 is a compilation album by musician AraabMuzik. It was released in July 2013 under Ultra Records.

Track list

References

External links
The Remixes, Vol. 1 by AraabMuzik at iTunes.com

2013 compilation albums
Ultra Records albums
AraabMuzik albums